WaveBurner was a Mac OS X professional application (proapp) bundled with Logic Studio for assembling, mastering, and burning audio CDs. Audio CDs created with WaveBurner could be played back on any audio CD player, and could be used as premasters to produce CDs in large numbers for possible distribution.

Features
WaveBurner has several notable features:
Allows for up to 99 tracks and 99 subindexes per track
Includes ISRC codes for each track
Includes copy prevention and pre-emphasis for each track
Adds UPC/EAN codes for the CD
Supports CD-Text
Create DDP (CD-image)

Optical disc authoring software
MacOS-only software made by Apple Inc.